Treasure Island is an album recorded in February 1974 by Keith Jarrett and originally released by Impulse! in 1974. It features Jarrett's later-to-be-called "American Quartet" (Dewey Redman, Charlie Haden, Paul Motian) plus guitarist Sam Brown, and percussionists Guilherme Franco and Danny Johnson. Two months after recording Treasure Island, in April 1974, Jarrett would enter a studio in Norway to record Belonging with a group of Scandinavian players, later called Jarrett's "European group".

In 2009, the album was reissued in a digipak case by Verve Music Group/Universal Music Group.

Original notes

Reception
In his AllMusic review, Thom Jurek awarded the album 4.5 stars and said: "This is a terrific sendoff to a very fertile, creative period and raises the question as to what else may have happened had this band been able to explore their unique, fully communal sound together for more than a pair of albums."

Writing for Record Collector, Charles Waring said the album "represents Jarrett's most easily digestible offering for Impulse! Highlights include the soulful, country-blues of "The Rich (And the Poor)", and the glistening, mellifluous title track.

Track listing

All compositions by Keith Jarrett except as indicated
 "The Rich (And the Poor)" – 9:24
 "Blue Streak" – 2:35
 "Fullsuvollivus (Fools of All of Us)" – 6:29
 "Treasure Island" – 4:14
 "Introduction/Yaqui Indian Folk Song" (Jarrett/traditional) – 2:16 
 "Le Mistral" – 9:25  
 "Angles (Without Edges)" – 5:24  
 "Sister Fortune" – 4:27

Personnel

Musicians
 Keith Jarrett – piano, soprano saxophone (7) and OSI drum
 Dewey Redman – tenor saxophone, tambourine (tracks 1, 2, 3, 5, 6, 7)
 Sam Brown – guitar (tracks 4, 8)
 Charlie Haden – bass
 Paul Motian – drums, percussion
 Guilherme Franco – percussion
 Danny Johnson – percussion

Production 
 Ed Michel – producer
 Tony May – engineer
 Rick Heenan – mix engineer (at The Village Recorder, Los Angeles)
 Roberto Masotti – photography

Verve 2009 reissue
 Harry Weinger – reissue supervision
 Kevin Reeves – mastering (at Universal Mastering Studios-East)
 Hollis King – art direction
 Isabelle Wong/isthetic – design
 Kyle Benson – A&R co-ordination
 Andy Kamn – production coordination

Notes 

Keith Jarrett albums
Impulse! Records albums
1974 albums